Neromia is a genus of moths in the family Geometridae first described by Staudinger in 1898.

Species
Some species of this genus are:
Neromia activa Prout, 1930
Neromia barretti Prout, 1912
Neromia chlorosticta Prout, 1912
Neromia clavicornis Prout, 1915
Neromia cohaerens Prout, 1916 
Neromia enotes Prout, 1917
Neromia impostura Prout, 1915
Neromia integrata Hausmann, 2009
Neromia manderensis Prout, 1916 
Neromia phoenicosticta Prout, 1912
Neromia picticosta Prout, 1913
Neromia propinquilinea Prout, 1920
Neromia pulvereisparsa (Hampson, 1896)
Neromia quieta (Prout, 1912)
Neromia rhodomadia Prout, 1922
Neromia rubripunctilla Prout, 1912
Neromia simplexa Brandt, 1938
Neromia strigulosa Prout, 1925

References

Geometrinae
Geometridae genera